Ghazi is a 2017 Indian war film written and directed by Sankalp Reddy, which was simultaneously shot in Telugu and Hindi languages, with the latter titled The Ghazi Attack. The film stars Rana Daggubati, Taapsee Pannu, Kay Kay Menon, Atul Kulkarni and Satya Dev.

Ghazi is inspired by true events from the mysterious sinking of  during the Indo-Pakistani War of 1971,. The story is about a submarine of the Indian Navy, an executive naval officer and his team, who remained underwater for 18 days. It is about the valour of the crew aboard the Indian submarine INS Karanj (S21), which destroyed the Pakistani PNS Ghazi submarine when it ventured into Indian waters to destroy  on the shores of Visakhapatnam. 

The film was released theatrically on 17 February 2017 to widespread critical acclaim and did decent business. It was declared "Average" by Box Office India. The film later won the National Film Award for Best Feature Film in Telugu. It was also nominated for Best Film and Best Director at 65th Filmfare Awards South.

Plot 
In November, 1971, India and Pakistan are on the verge of declaring war on each other, as a result of the refugee crisis precipitated by the Pakistan Army under Operation Searchlight. The Indian Navy and RAW decipher a secret code sent from Pakistan to East Pakistan (modern-day Bangladesh), relating to a possible attack on an Indian naval vessel. The Navy deduces that the target may be , India's sole aircraft carrier. The top command dispatches the submarine S21, under the command of Captain Ranvijay Singh for recce missions. To temper Singh's belligerent tendencies, the Indian Navy Admiral assigns Lt. Cmdr Arjun Varma to S21, with orders to ensure that Singh does not confront any Pakistani warships and trigger a war.

The Navy's top command soon learns that the Pakistan Navy has dispatched PNS Ghazi, under Cmdr. Razak Khan, to the Bay of Bengal to confront  Vikrant. Meanwhile, to divert the attention of the enemy, Ghazi torpedoes an Indian merchant ship. The attack is picked by S21, which races to the scene. Noticing survivors in the wreckage, Arjun jumps into the sea and manages to rescue a girl child and a woman, both of whom are Bengali refugees. During surveillance, S21 acquires a sonar signal of Ghazi.

Singh believes that they should track down Ghazi and attack, while Arjun obstructs, reiterating his instructions. Singh then orders the ship's EXO, Lt. Commander Santosh Devraj to conduct a drill and target Ghazi while doing so, despite Arjun's protests. They fire a torpedo, which misses Ghazi narrowly, thus alerting them of their presence. Aware of the enemy's presence, Razak orders his crew to head towards Visakhapatnam Port at full speed and to set up mines en-route, planning to destroy S21.

S21 pursues Ghazi's path and realizes at the last moment that it is headed into mines. Singh and Arjun frantically attempt to change its course but a mine explodes in the stern and damages most of the sub's batteries, propellers and circuits. The sub blows open many leaks, with the forward torpedo compartment flooded, crippling the sub and barring it from firing its forward torpedoes. Singh dies while trying to save Arjun, as S21 sinks to the sea-bed.

Arjun, now in command of the sub, regroups and work towards reviving S21. They manage to clog the sub's leaks and pumps the excess water out, before holding a final farewell for Singh. The crew noticed that the vessel is incapable of moving in any direction, except upwards or downwards. Since they are unable to chase Ghazi, the crew artificially trigger one of the naval mines in its vicinity to lure Ghazi to their position. Razak, believing S21 is still operational, orders his crew to turn around to sink S21.
Arjun and Devraj plan to lure Ghazi within its range of firing, but a suspicious Razak orders Ghazi's course to be changed at the last minute.

Ghazi, now having the ability to attack S21, fires six torpedoes, all of which are avoided by S21 through depth changing maneuvers, much to Razak's frustration. S21 dives to 350 m, in order to slip from  Ghazi's sonar range despite being designed for a maximum of 250 m depth. With very limited battery support, Arjun instigates Ghazi into attacking by transmitting his crew singing 'Saare Jahaan se Achchha' and the Indian National Anthem. Riled up by S21's defiance, Razak orders another torpedo attack on S21, for which Ghazi will have to turn by port 180 degrees. Arjun dives into the flooded forward compartment to manually trigger the torpedoes, successfully managing to do so. Ghazi also launches its torpedo at the same time. The torpedo launched by Ghazi misses S21 narrowly, but it is hit by S21's torpedo and disintegrates in the water, killing the entire crew. S21 surfaces and the crew manages to save Arjun from the flooded compartment in the nick of time. S21 is later saved by a patrolling Indian Navy vessel.

The ending titles narrate the mysterious circumstances about Ghazi's fate, with its sinking credited to the actions of INS Rajput. It also mentions that in the aftermath of Ghazi's sinking, India and Pakistan had declared war on each other, which would ultimately result in India's victory, Pakistan's surrender and the creation of Bangladesh.

Cast 

 Rana Daggubati as Lieutenant Commander Arjun Varma 
 Kay Kay Menon as Captain Ran Vijay Singh
 Atul Kulkarni as Lieutenant Commander Santosh Devraj, Executive Officer
 Taapsee Pannu as Dr. Ananya, a Bengali doctor turned refugee
 Om Puri as Admiral V.S. Nanda, Indian Navy
 Nassar as Vice Admiral K.T. Raman, Indian Navy
 Milind Gunaji as Girish Kumar, RAW Agent
 Rahul Singh as Commander Razak Khan, Ghazi
 Satyadev as Rajeev Thakur, Sonar operator S21
 Ravi Varma as Kamalakar Shinde, Battery operator of the S21
 Priyadarshi Pullikonda as Lt. Nilesh Mishra, Radio operator of S21
 Bharath Reddy as B.Sanjay of S21
 Bikramjeet Kanwarpal as Pakistan Navy Staff Officer
 Thiruveer as V.Murthy, Depth Controller of S21
 Jay Jha as Navigation Officer, Ghazi
 Capt SN Ahmed as Lieutenant Taan Singh, torpedo operator of the S21
 Niteesh Pandey as N.Tiwari, steering controller of the S21
 Kunal Kaushik as Kapil Singh
 Malyaban Lahiri as Ranjan Sengupta, Junior Officer of the S21
 Naren Yadav as Ram Sagar of the S21
 Dhruva as Saleem of the S21
 Lakshmikanth Dev as Raj of the S21
 Ramanuj Dubey as Indian cook Iqbal S21
 Ravi Kumar Shada
 Akshay Mittal as Sublieutenant – Indian Naval Navigation Officer S21
 Rama Rao Jadhav as Pump Controller S21
 Laxman Meesala
 Appaji Ambarisha Darbha as Ananya's father

Production

Development 
PVP Cinema has produced the film. Karan Johar distributed the Hindi version. The music is composed by K. Visual Effects handled by Eva Motion Studios.

Casting and crew 
The film stars Rana Daggubati and Taapsee Pannu in the lead along with Kay Kay Menon, Satyadev Kancharana, Atul Kulkarni, Ramanuj Dubey, Kunal Kaushik, Priyadarshi Pulikonda, Rahul Singh, Akshay Mittal, Malyaban Lahiri and Naren Yadav. Cinematography is done by Madhi, music composed by K, Visual Effects Supervisor Vasudeva R Enugala and editing by Sreeker Prasad.

Filming 
The film shooting started on 3 January 2016.

Actual events 
Indian Navy claims to have sunk the PNS Ghazi on 3 December 1971 at the Vishakhapatnam harbour when then Captain Inder Singh of INS Rajput ordered the attack upon it. However the Pakistan Navy dispute the claim; as Pakistan naval inquiries believes the Ghazi might have sunk due to it mistakenly entering its own minefield and collided with one of the mines, which resulted in the violent underwater explosion.

Box office 
Ghazi grossed a total of  overall, including  in India and $975,000 overseas.

Critical reception 

Renuka Vyavahare of The Times of India gave the film a rating of 3 out of 5 and said that, "While the visuals and special effects lack finesse, the film compensates for it with its riveting story. Despite the hitches, this underwater thriller is worth a watch." Shalini Langer of The Indian Express gave the film a rating of 1.5 out of 5 saying that the film "could have been an engrossing crisis-at-sea drama but the film is so busy slaying Pakistanis that it loses sight of its core strengths." Prasanna D Zore of Rediff said that, "The Ghazi Attack is a riveting telling of a war story" and gave the film a rating of 4 out of 5. Saibal Chatterjee of NDTV gave the film a rating of 2.5 out of 5 saying that, "The Ghazi Attack delivers many a riveting moment and is bolstered by the talent of a few capable actors. Its plot, however, is devoid of any mystery." Bollywood Hungama gave the film a rating of 3.5 out of 5 saying that the movie "is a gripping war drama that leaves a stunning impact." Divya Pal of News18 criticized the screenplay and direction of the film and gave the film a rating of 1.5 out of 5 saying that, "All in all, "The Ghazi Attack" is utterly disappointing." Authors at "The Reading Hook" featured this film in their list of best Bollywood War Movies ever made and was positively accepted by their readers."

Awards and nominations

See also 

 Raazi

References

External links 
 
 

2017 films
2010s action war films
2010s Telugu-language films
Films scored by K (composer)
Films based on Indo-Pakistani wars and conflicts
Pakistan Navy in fiction
Films about submarine warfare
2010s Hindi-language films
Indian multilingual films
Indian action war films
Indian Navy in films
Best Telugu Feature Film National Film Award winners
Indian avant-garde and experimental films
2017 multilingual films
2017 directorial debut films
Films directed by Sankalp Reddy
Cold War submarine films
Submarine films
Films based on the Bangladesh Liberation War
Films set in East Pakistan
Military of Pakistan in films